Ultimate Spinach III is the third and final album by the American psychedelic rock band Ultimate Spinach, and was released on MGM Records in 1969.

Background 
A few days before the production for Ultimate Spinach III began late 1968, the group was disbanded for personal differences with their record producer Alan Lorber. However, the third album needed to be produced due to contractual obligations with MGM Records.

Female lead vocalist Barbara Hudson and drummer Russell Levine were the only surviving members, while guitarist Ted Myers agreed to return after a year out. The Ultimate Spinach sextet was completed with three new musicians from other Boston local rock bands.

In consequence, this album lacks the creative genius of Ian Bruce-Douglas: the sound and structures are not very experimental and the content of the lyrics is more conventional instead of the frequently "lysergic", dark and introspective which is present in their two previous concept albums.

Ted Myers and Tony Scheuren, ex bandmates in Chamaeleon Church, wrote most songs (some of them, even individually), while the rest of the band was reunited only for exhausting rehearsals and recording sessions, made in just nine days in Mayfair Studios, New York, in December 1968. The result was a very inconsistent album with a mix of psychedelic, hard rock and pop styles that sounded like the work of several different bands.

After the critical and commercial failure with this record, Ultimate Spinach was definitely disbanded in mid-1969.

Track listing
All music composed by Ultimate Spinach.

 LP Side A 

LP Side B

Personnel
 Barbara Jean Hudson – vocals, acoustic guitar
Ted Myers – lead vocals, lead guitar
Jeff Baxter – lead guitar, steel guitar, vibraphone, vocals
 Tony Scheuren – organ, piano, acoustic guitar, vocals 
 Mike Levine – bass guitar
 Russell Levine – drums, percussion

References

1969 albums
Ultimate Spinach albums